Quintón Christina (born 3 May 1995) is a Curaçaoan footballer who plays as a midfielder for Partizán Bardejov of 2. liga.

Club career
Christina has played for Jong Holland of the Curaçao League, the top football league in Curaçao, since 2011. In 2012, Christina was given a 10-day trial with Zwolle of the Eredivisie, the highest level of football in the Netherlands.

In December 2013, it was announced that Christina was one of 23 top young Caribbean prospects to be invited to the inaugural MLS Caribbean Combine, a joint venture between Major League Soccer and the Caribbean Football Union with the objective of providing the young players with an opportunity to play in front of MLS scouts. Following the 3-day event, Christina was one of only two players selected to participate in the MLS Combine from 10-14 of January in Fort Lauderdale, Florida, along with Stefano Rijssel of Suriname.

International career
Christina represented Curaçao at various youth levels including Under-17 and Under-20, including as part of the Under-20 squad that competed in the 2013 CONCACAF U-20 Championship in Mexico with hopes of qualifying for the 2013 FIFA U-20 World Cup in Turkey.  In November 2013, it was announced that Christina was named to the roster for the senior squad as they prepared for the 2012 ABCS Tournament, an annual tournament between the Dutch-speaking countries of the Caribbean. He made his senior debut on 13 July 2012 in a match against Aruba in the tournament.  Christina was named to the squad again for the 2013 edition of the tournament.

References

External links

1995 births
Living people
People from Willemstad
Association football midfielders
Curaçao footballers
Curaçao international footballers
CRKSV Jong Holland players
Sekshon Pagá players
FK Inter Bratislava players
FC Petržalka players
Partizán Bardejov players
2. Liga (Slovakia) players
Expatriate footballers in Slovakia
Curaçao expatriate sportspeople in Slovakia
Curaçao under-20 international footballers
Curaçao youth international footballers